The Lansing Capitals are a now-defunct member of the Independent Basketball Association (IBA). Founded in 2006, the Capitals were originally members of the International Basketball League. The team played their home games at Aim High Sports at The Summit Sports and Ice Complex in Dimondale, Michigan.

IBL history
The Capitals played a full IBL season in 2006 and a partial season in 2007. In the first full season of competition, the Capitals had two players named to the 2006 IBL All-Star team: Cory Coe, who was the third leading scorer in the league at 28.1 ppg, and Steve Ordiway, who averaged 23.5 ppg.

The team went on hiatus in summer of 2007 and did not play again until the 2010 IBL Spring season, when they returned to the IBL as a "branding" (part-time) team. After another part-time season in the 2011 winter season, Lansing played their final IBL campaign during the 2011 Spring season before leaving for the IBA. In 2016, the team folded.

Player advancement
The Capitals have placed multiple players in other leagues, such as the ABA, IBA, PBL, and UBA, as well as in European professional leagues, including: Cory Coe (Portugal), Carlos Gill (Spain), David Kone (France), Jonathan Jones (Slovakia), and Derrick Nelson (Saudi Arabia).

Season-by-season

References

External links
Lansing Capitals official website
Team page on IBA website

Independent Basketball Association teams
Sports in Lansing, Michigan
Basketball teams in Michigan
Basketball teams established in 2006
2006 establishments in Michigan